The Musikhochschule Münster (Münster School of Music) founded in 1972, is a university of music, part of the University of Münster, it is one of the five music universities in North Rhine-Westphalia.

From 1972 to 2003 the Musikhochschule Münster was integrated as a campus of the Hochschule für Musik Detmold. In 2004 the Musikhochschule Münster separated from Detmold and on the basis of the revision of the Hochschule law passed on 16 December 2003 became the Faculty of Music of the University of Münster on 1 April 2004.

In 2004, the Musikhochschule Münster was the first music school in Germany to introduce the degree Bachelor of Music. In addition to the bachelor's degree, the Hochschule now offers the degree of Master of Music, the Diploma of Music and the Certificate. As the new degree courses were introduced, the Hochschule benefitted from the long-year cooperation as a department of the Hochschule für Musik Detmold.

The Musikhochschule Münster now comprises 220 students, 15 professors (from Germany, Brazil, Holland and Norway) and 65 part-time instructors.
The Symphony Orchestra is the largest ensemble of the Musikhochschule Münster. Past music directors included Joachim Harder, Geoffrey Moull and René Gulikers. The present conductor is Christian Lorenz.

Notable alumni
 Cico Beck, percussionist
 Tilo Beckmann, German singer, coach and arranger
 Mungonzazal Janshindulam, classical pianist
 Suyoen Kim, classical violinist
 Christoph Stegemann, German opera and concert singer

References

External links 
 Homepage der Musikhochschule Münster 
 Prüfungsordnung 2004 der Musikhochschule Münster
 Angaben des Deutschen Musikinformationszentrums

Culture in Münster
Universities and colleges in North Rhine-Westphalia
University of Münster
Educational institutions established in 1972